Max Reinhardt (30 November 1915 – 19 November 2002) was a British publisher. He published Aleksandr I. Solzhenitsyn, George Bernard Shaw and Graham Greene.

Biography
Max Reinhardt was born on 30 November 1915 in Istanbul to Austrian parents. He attended an English High School in Istanbul. His parents set up an import and export business in London which he headed. After the Second World War he took a course in international relations at the London School of Economics. During a bridge game, he met A. S. Frere, who inspired him to change his import and export business into a publishing house. Reinhardt then bought HFL Publishers, a company that published Accounting textbooks.

Max Reinhardt's first author was George Bernard Shaw, who reissued his romantic correspondence with the actress Ellen Terry. In 1957, Reinhardt and a banker partner bought the Bodley Head publishing house, where Reinhardt built a strong editing team, naming Graham Greene as director. Greene published his own novels there. They also published Alistair Cooke, Maurice Sendak, William Trevor and Eric Ambler. Bodley Head was purchased by Random House, and both Reinhardt and Greene resigned. Reinhardt kept ownership of HFL, renaming it Reinhardt Books which was later bought by Viking Press.

He died on 19 November 2002.

References

Further reading
Lambert, J W,. and Ratcliffe, M., 1987: The Bodley Head 1887-1987. The Bodley Head: London.

External links
 The Independent: obituary

1915 births
2002 deaths
Publishers (people) from London
20th-century English businesspeople
Turkish emigrants to the United Kingdom